Emphasis of matter is a type of paragraph in an auditors' report on financial statements.  Such a paragraph is added to indicate a matter which is disclosed appropriately in the notes forming part of the financial statements that the auditor considers is fundamental to the users' understanding of the financial statements.

An emphasis of matter paragraph indicates that the auditor's opinion is not modified with respect to the matter emphasized.

Under the framework of the International Standards on Auditing (ISA), the emphasis of matter paragraph is placed after the opinion paragraph (and, consequently, towards the end of the report), in the auditor's report.

References

Auditing